In differential geometry, the Laplace–Beltrami operator is a generalization of the Laplace operator to functions defined on submanifolds in Euclidean space and, even more generally, on Riemannian and pseudo-Riemannian manifolds. It is named after Pierre-Simon Laplace and Eugenio Beltrami.

For any twice-differentiable real-valued function f defined on Euclidean space Rn, the Laplace operator (also known as the Laplacian) takes f to the divergence of its gradient vector field, which is the sum of the n pure second derivatives of f with respect to each vector of an orthonormal basis for Rn. Like the Laplacian, the Laplace–Beltrami operator is defined as the divergence of the gradient, and is a linear operator taking functions into functions. The operator can be extended to operate on tensors as the divergence of the covariant derivative. Alternatively, the operator can be generalized to operate on differential forms using the divergence and exterior derivative. The resulting operator is called the Laplace–de Rham operator (named after Georges de Rham).

Details
The Laplace–Beltrami operator, like the Laplacian, is the divergence of the gradient:

An explicit formula in local coordinates is possible.

Suppose first that M is an oriented Riemannian manifold. The orientation allows one to specify a definite volume form on M, given in an oriented coordinate system xi by

where  is the absolute value of the determinant of the metric tensor, and the dxi are the 1-forms forming the dual frame to the frame

The divergence of a vector field X on the manifold is then defined as the scalar function with the property

where LX is the Lie derivative along the vector field X. In local coordinates, one obtains

where here and below the Einstein notation is implied, so that the repeated index i is summed over.
 
The gradient of a scalar function ƒ is the vector field grad f that may be defined through the inner product  on the manifold, as

for all vectors vx anchored at point x in the tangent space TxM of the manifold at point x.  Here, dƒ is the exterior derivative of the function ƒ; it is a 1-form taking argument vx. In local coordinates, one has

where gij are the components of the inverse of the metric tensor, so that  with δik the Kronecker delta.

Combining the definitions of the gradient and divergence, the formula for the Laplace–Beltrami operator applied to a scalar function ƒ is, in local coordinates

If M is not oriented, then the above calculation carries through exactly as presented, except that the volume form must instead be replaced by a volume element (a density rather than a form).  Neither the gradient nor the divergence actually depends on the choice of orientation, and so the Laplace–Beltrami operator itself does not depend on this additional structure.

Formal self-adjointness

     (proof)

where the last equality is an application of Stokes' theorem.  Dualizing gives

Conversely, characterizes the Laplace–Beltrami operator completely, in the sense that it is the only operator with this property.

Because the Laplace–Beltrami operator, as defined in this manner, is negative rather than positive, often it is defined with the opposite sign.

Eigenvalues of the Laplace–Beltrami operator (Lichnerowicz–Obata theorem)
Let M denote a compact Riemannian manifold without boundary. We want to consider the eigenvalue equation,

where  is the eigenfunction associated with the eigenvalue . It can be shown using the self-adjointness proved above that the eigenvalues  are real. The compactness of the manifold  allows one to show that the eigenvalues are discrete and furthermore, the vector space of eigenfunctions associated with a given eigenvalue , i.e. the eigenspaces are all finite-dimensional. Notice by taking the constant function as an eigenfunction, we get  is an eigenvalue. Also since we have considered  an integration by parts shows that . More precisely if we multiply the eigenvalue equation through by the eigenfunction  and integrate the resulting equation on  we get (using the notation ):

Performing an integration by parts or what is the same thing as using the divergence theorem on the term on the left, and since  has no boundary we get

Putting the last two equations together we arrive at

We conclude from the last equation that .

Assume the Ricci curvature satisfies the lower bound:

Then the first positive eigenvalue  of the eigenvalue equation satisfies the lower bound:

This lower bound is sharp and achieved on the sphere . Using spherical coordinates , on  the two dimensional sphere, set

we see easily from the formula for the spherical Laplacian displayed below that

Thus the lower bound in Lichnerowicz's theorem is achieved at least in two dimensions.

Conversely it was proved by Morio Obata, that if the n-dimensional compact Riemannian manifold without boundary were such that for the first positive eigenvalue  one has,

then the manifold is isometric to the n-dimensional sphere , the sphere of radius . Proofs of all these statements may be found in the book by Isaac Chavel. Analogous sharp bounds also hold for other Geometries and for certain degenerate Laplacians associated with these geometries like the Kohn Laplacian (after Joseph J. Kohn) on a compact CR manifold. Applications there are to the global embedding of such CR manifolds in

Tensor Laplacian

The Laplace–Beltrami operator can be written using the trace (or contraction) of the iterated covariant derivative associated with the Levi-Civita connection. The Hessian (tensor) of a function  is the symmetric 2-tensor

where df denotes the (exterior) derivative of a function f.

Let Xi be a basis of tangent vector fields (not necessarily induced by a coordinate system). Then the components of Hess f are given by

This is easily seen to transform tensorially, since it is linear in each of the arguments Xi, Xj.  The Laplace–Beltrami operator is then the trace (or contraction) of the Hessian with respect to the metric:

.

More precisely, this means

,

or in terms of the metric

In abstract indices, the operator is often written

provided it is understood implicitly that this trace is in fact the trace of the Hessian tensor.

Because the covariant derivative extends canonically to arbitrary tensors, the Laplace–Beltrami operator defined on a tensor T by

is well-defined.

Laplace–de Rham operator
More generally, one can define a Laplacian differential operator on sections of the bundle of differential forms on a pseudo-Riemannian manifold. On a Riemannian manifold it is an elliptic operator, while on a Lorentzian manifold it is hyperbolic. The Laplace–de Rham operator is defined by

The first order operator  is the Hodge–Dirac operator.

When computing the Laplace–de Rham operator on a scalar function f, we have , so that

Up to an overall sign, the Laplace–de Rham operator is equivalent to the previous definition of the Laplace–Beltrami operator when acting on a scalar function; see the proof for details. On functions, the Laplace–de Rham operator is actually the negative of the Laplace–Beltrami operator, as the conventional normalization of the codifferential assures that the Laplace–de Rham operator is (formally) positive definite, whereas the Laplace–Beltrami operator is typically negative.  The sign is merely a convention, and both are common in the literature.  The Laplace–de Rham operator differs more significantly from the tensor Laplacian restricted to act on skew-symmetric tensors.  Apart from the incidental sign, the two operators differ by a Weitzenböck identity that explicitly involves the Ricci curvature tensor.

Examples 
Many examples of the Laplace–Beltrami operator can be worked out explicitly.

Euclidean space
In the usual (orthonormal) Cartesian coordinates xi on Euclidean space, the metric is reduced to the Kronecker delta, and one therefore has .  Consequently, in this case

which is the ordinary Laplacian. In curvilinear coordinates, such as spherical or cylindrical coordinates, one obtains alternative expressions.

Similarly, the Laplace–Beltrami operator corresponding to the Minkowski metric with signature  is the d'Alembertian.

Spherical Laplacian
The spherical Laplacian is the Laplace–Beltrami operator on the -sphere with its canonical metric of constant sectional curvature 1.  It is convenient to regard the sphere as isometrically embedded into Rn as the unit sphere centred at the origin.  Then for a function f on Sn−1, the spherical Laplacian is defined by

Concretely, this is implied by the well-known formula for the Euclidean Laplacian in spherical polar coordinates:

More generally, one can formulate a similar trick using the normal bundle to define the Laplace–Beltrami operator of any Riemannian manifold isometrically embedded as a hypersurface of Euclidean space.

One can also give an intrinsic description of the Laplace–Beltrami operator on the sphere in a normal coordinate system.  Let  be spherical coordinates on the sphere with respect to a particular point p of the sphere (the "north pole"), that is geodesic polar coordinates with respect to p.  Here ϕ represents the latitude measurement along a unit speed geodesic from p, and ξ a parameter representing the choice of direction of the geodesic in Sn−1. Then the spherical Laplacian has the form:

where  is the Laplace–Beltrami operator on the ordinary unit -sphere.  In particular, for the ordinary 2-sphere using standard notation for polar coordinates we get:

Hyperbolic space
A similar technique works in hyperbolic space.  Here the hyperbolic space Hn−1 can be embedded into the n dimensional Minkowski space, a real vector space equipped with the quadratic form

Then Hn is the subset of the future null cone in Minkowski space given by

Then

The operator can also be written in polar coordinates.  Let  be spherical coordinates on the sphere with respect to a particular point p of Hn−1 (say, the center of the Poincaré disc).  Here t represents the hyperbolic distance from p and ξ a parameter representing the choice of direction of the geodesic in Sn−2. Then the hyperbolic Laplacian has the form:

where  is the Laplace–Beltrami operator on the ordinary unit (n − 2)-sphere.  In particular, for the hyperbolic plane using standard notation for polar coordinates we get:

See also 
 Covariant derivative
 Laplacian operators in differential geometry
 Laplace operator

Notes

References 
 
 .

Differential operators
Riemannian geometry

de:Verallgemeinerter Laplace-Operator#Laplace-Beltrami-Operator